CAB 4 is the third studio album by the instrumental rock/jazz fusion band CAB, released on September 23, 2003 through Favored Nations.

Critical reception

Todd S. Jenkins at All About Jazz gave CAB 4 a positive review, calling it an improvement over the first two albums and "arguably the best effort yet from a group that bears further watching." All musicians were praised for their contributions and technical mastery, with Jenkins calling the band "a remarkable unit, their interplay marked by dime-turning tightness, their solos brilliantly exposed and crafted."

Track listing

Personnel
Tony MacAlpine – guitar, keyboard, production
Patrice Rushen – clavinet, Rhodes piano, piano
Brian Auger – keyboard, Hammond organ
Bunny Brunel – keyboard, percussion programming, bass, engineering, mixing, production
Dennis Chambers – drums
Bernard Torelli – percussion programming, engineering, mixing, mastering
Karma Auger – engineering
Lance Jacobson – engineering

References

External links
"Auger "Cab 4" - In Review" at Guitar Nine Records

CAB (band) albums
2003 albums
Favored Nations albums